Julio Aparicio (born 30 January 1955) is a former Peruvian international striker best known for winning multiple Peruvian national titles and the 1975 Copa America competition.

Club career

He won the Peruvian Premier Division with his club Club Universitario de Deportes in 1974. He later participated in the 1975 Copa Libertadores competition where Universitario reached the semi-final group stage.

In 1978 Aparicio transferred from Universitario to Sporting Cristal, where he would later participate in their 1978 Copa Libertadores campaign. They were eliminated in the group stage, and Aparicio scored the only goal in a 1-4 defeat away game with the club Alianza Lima. He won the Peruvian national championship in 1979 and 1980 whilst a player with Sporting Cristal.

Achievements

Universitario
Peruvian Primera División: 1974
Sporting Cristal
Peruvian Primera División: 1979

International career

He made his debut for Peru on 22 June 1975 and his final game came on 17 July 1977. In total, Apararicio played six games for country. During this time he was involved in the 1975 Copa America tournament which Peru won for the second time in its history. In 1977, he took part in the qualifying campaign for the 1978 FIFA World Cup playing in a 5-0 victory over Bolivia 5-0.

References

External links

1955 births
Living people
Peruvian footballers
Peru international footballers
1975 Copa América players
Copa América-winning players
Club Universitario de Deportes footballers
Sporting Cristal footballers
Peruvian Primera División players
Association football forwards